Allotrechiama is a genus of beetles in the family Carabidae, containing the following species:

 Allotrechiama dentifer Ueno, 1978
 Allotrechiama iriei Ueno, 1970
 Allotrechiama tenellus Ueno, 1959
 Allotrechiama mandibularis Ueno, 1978

References

Trechinae